NordForsk is an organisation run by the Nordic Council which finances and facilitates Nordic cooperation in research and research infrastructure.

NordForsk was established in 2005 by the Nordic Council to support Nordic research. National Research Councils, universities and other organisations that finance research are key stakeholders in NordForsk.

By funding and managing research programs, NordForsk brings together national environments and ensures the highest quality research.

NordForsk aims to increase the quality, impact and efficiency of Nordic research collaboration and thus contribute to the Nordic region being a world leader in research and innovation.

The NordForsk Secretariat is located at Stensberggata 25 in Oslo.

References

External links 
 NordForsk

Nordic Council
Nordic organizations
Research in Norway